SQUOZE (abbreviated as SQZ) is a memory-efficient representation of a combined source and relocatable object program file with a symbol table on punched cards which was introduced in 1958 with the SCAT assembler on the SHARE Operating System (SOS) for the IBM 709. A program in this format was called a SQUOZE deck. It was also used on later machines including the IBM 7090 and 7094.

Encoding 
In the SQUOZE encoding, identifiers in the symbol table were represented in a 50-character alphabet, allowing a 36-bit machine word to represent six alphanumeric characters plus two flag bits, thus saving two bits per six characters, because the six bits normally allocated for each character could store up to 64 states rather than only the 50 states needed to represent the 50 letters of the alphabet, and 506 < 234.

Using base 50 already saves a single bit every three characters, so it was used in two three-character chunks. The manual has a formula for encoding six characters ABCDEF:   

For example "SQUOZE", normally 36 bits: 35 33 37 31 44 17(base 8) would be encoded in two 17-bit pieces to fit in the 34 bits as ( 0o220231 << 17 ) | 0o175473 == 0o110114575473.  

A simpler example of the same logic would be how a three-digit BCD number would take up 12 bits, such as 987: 9 8 7(base 16) 1001 1000 0111(base 2), but any such value could be stored in 10 bits directly, saving two bits, such as 987: 3db(base 16) 11 1101 1011(base 2).

Etymology
"Squoze" is a facetious past participle of the verb 'to squeeze'.

The name SQUOZE was later borrowed for similar schemes used on DEC machines; they had a 40-character alphabet (50 in octal) and were called DEC RADIX 50 and MOD40, but sometimes nicknamed DEC Squoze.

See also
 Packed BCD
 Hertz encoding
 Chen–Ho encoding
 Densely packed decimal (DPD)
 BCD (character encoding)
 Base 50 (numeral system)
 Base conversion

References

Further reading 
 
  (1 page)

Executable file formats